Kylie Minogue Wines is a wine brand developed by Australian singer Kylie Minogue, in collaboration with English beverages distributor Benchmark Drinks. Founded in 2020, Kylie Minogue Wines sells nine different varieties of wine produced in France, Italy, Australia, and Spain.

Background
Minogue stated that she first appreciated wine when she travelled to France at the age of 21, with her boyfriend at the time, Australian musician Michael Hutchence of rock band INXS. Minogue first considered launching a wine brand in 2017, when she was recording her fourteenth studio album Golden (2018) in Nashville, Tennessee. Minogue developed her range of wines with Australian businessman Paul Schaafsma, CEO of English distributor Benchmark Drinks, who has also developed wines for other celebrities such as English musician Gary Barlow and Scottish chef Gordon Ramsay. The brand was launched on 28 May 2020, to coincide with Minogue's 52nd birthday.

Kylie Minogue Wines was introduced in the United States in June 2022. In celebration of the launch, Minogue held an intimate jazz performance at the Carlyle Hotel in New York City, a hotel which serves Minogue's wines in its restaurants and bars. The launch was attended by celebrity guests including Lucy Liu and Christian Siriano.

Commercial reception
According to The Guardian, Kylie Minogue Wines' Prosecco Rosé generated GB£7.7 million in 2021, and was described as the United Kingdom's "top selling branded prosecco rosé". Additionally, it was reported that in September 2021, Minogue's prosecco rosé had become the number one branded prosecco in the UK according to Nielsen Holdings data.

Varieties of wine

Kylie Minogue Wines currently sells the following varieties:

 Prosecco rosé, produced in Gambellara, Italy
 Rosé Vin de France, produced in Provence, France
 Sauvignon blanc, produced in Gascony, France
 Merlot, produced in Languedoc-Roussillon, France
 Cava, produced in Penedès, Spain
 Côtes de Provence rosé, produced in Provence, France
 Côtes de Provence cru classé rosé, produced in Provence, France
 Chardonnay, produced in Margaret River, Australia
 Pinot noir, produced in Yarra Valley, Australia

Awards
 The Drinks Business Awards 2021: Best Launch of the Year – special commendation (Kylie Minogue Wines)
 Global Chardonnay Masters 2020 – gold medal (Margaret River Chardonnay)

See also
 Kylie Minogue products
 List of celebrities who own wineries and vineyards

References

External links
 

Wines
Wine brands
2020 establishments in England
English brands
Drink companies based in London
Companies based in the London Borough of Wandsworth
Australian wine